The 1997 Mountain Dew Southern 500, the 48th running of the event, was a NASCAR Winston Cup Series race held on August 31, 1997 at Darlington Raceway in Darlington, South Carolina. Bobby Labonte won the pole position and Jeff Gordon won the race for the third time in his career and clinched the Winston Million.

Background

Darlington Raceway, nicknamed by many NASCAR fans and drivers as "The Lady in Black" or "The Track Too Tough to Tame" and advertised as a "NASCAR Tradition", is a race track built for NASCAR racing located near Darlington, South Carolina. It is of a unique, somewhat egg-shaped design, an oval with the ends of very different configurations, a condition which supposedly arose from the proximity of one end of the track to a minnow pond the owner refused to relocate. This situation makes it very challenging for the crews to set up their cars' handling in a way that will be effective at both ends.

The track is a four-turn  oval. The track's first two turns are banked at twenty-five degrees, while the final two turns are banked two degrees lower at twenty-three degrees. The front stretch (the location of the finish line) and the back stretch is banked at six degrees. Darlington Raceway can seat up to 60,000 people.

Darlington has something of a legendary quality among drivers and older fans; this is probably due to its long track length relative to other NASCAR speedways of its era and hence the first venue where many of them became cognizant of the truly high speeds that stock cars could achieve on a long track. The track allegedly earned the moniker The Lady in Black because the night before the race the track maintenance crew would cover the entire track with fresh asphalt sealant, in the early years of the speedway, thus making the racing surface dark black. Darlington is also known as "The Track Too Tough to Tame" because drivers can run lap after lap without a problem and then bounce off of the wall the following lap. Racers will frequently explain that they have to race the racetrack, not their competition. Drivers hitting the wall are considered to have received their "Darlington Stripe" thanks to the missing paint on the right side of the car.

Summary
Dave Marcis, Greg Sacks and Morgan Shepherd all failed to qualify. The race had 11 cautions for 67 laps. Ernie Irvan had just gotten a lap back and as he was catching up to the field, the wrecked 12 of Jeff Purvis pulled down in front of Irvan and tore up the 28. It did damage to the cooling system and his pit stall was covered in water after every stop. He would eventually drop out of the race on lap 183 due to engine issues. A very odd instance of the race occurred when all the lead lap cars came in during the caution on lap 295 because of the nasty rain. Dale Jarrett was in the lead since lap 258 and his pit crew was telling him to stay out but for some reason he came in at the last second possible instead of staying out in case the race was called. Jeff Gordon came out in 1st after the pit stops and kept the lead for the last 72 laps that were left.

Dale Earnhardt suffered a blackout during the pace laps and crashed, ending his day. After the car was repaired, Busch Series driver Mike Dillon (the son-in-law of car owner Richard Childress) replaced him in the No. 3 car and got a 30th-place finish, 85 laps behind winner Jeff Gordon.

Several crashes and a brief instance of rain allowed the race to last for four hours and eight minutes. Gordon held off a late charge by Jeff Burton to win his ninth race of the year and the Winston Million by less than 0.2 seconds (his 28th overall). ESPN's Bob Jenkins called the ending thus:

The only other driver to have accomplished the Winston Million was Bill Elliott, who finished fourth and led the most laps. Rusty Wallace finished 43rd after a crash that collected Kyle Petty, Robby Gordon, and Todd Bodine on lap 5. He ended up with $29,270. The total winners' purse was $1,202,356 ($ considering inflation). Gordon won $131,330 for winning plus an additional $1,000,000 for winning the Winston Million.

Official results

Timeline
Section reference: 
 Start of race: Bobby Labonte started the race with the pole position.
 Lap 3: Bill Elliott took over the lead from Bobby Labonte.
 Lap 7: First caution of the race, ended on lap 11.
 Lap 46: Jeff Burton took over the lead from Bill Elliott.
 Lap 70: Michael Waltrip took over the lead from Jeff Burton.
 Lap 72: Jeff Gordon took over the lead from Michael Waltrip.
 Lap 109: Second caution of the race, ended on lap 114.
 Lap 116: Bill Elliott took over the lead from Jeff Gordon.
 Lap 120: Third caution of the race, ended on lap 125.
 Lap 135: Fourth caution of the race, ended on lap 139.
 Lap 136: Ted Musgrave took over the lead from Bill Elliott.
 Lap 140: Bill Elliott took over the lead from Ted Musgrave.
 Lap 168: Fifth caution of the race, ended on lap 175.
 Lap 180: Sixth caution of the race, ended on lap 186.
 Lap 211: Seventh caution of the race, ended on lap 216.
 Lap 251: Eighth caution of the race, ended on lap 256.
 Lap 258: Dale Jarrett took over the lead from Bill Elliott.
 Lap 274: Ninth caution of the race, ended on lap 278.
 Lap 295: Tenth caution of the race, ended on lap 302.
 Lap 296: Jeff Gordon took over the lead from Dale Jarrett.
 Lap 344: Eleventh caution of the race, ended on lap 367.
 Finish: Jeff Gordon was officially declared the winner.

Standings after the race

References

Mountain Dew Southern 500
Mountain Dew Southern 500
Mountain Dew Southern 500
NASCAR races at Darlington Raceway